Ludvík Kohl, in German; Ludwig Kohl (14 April 1746, Prague - 18 June 1821, Prague) was a Czech-Austrian painter, draftsman, and etcher.

Biography
His father, Antonín Kohl, was an engraver and his grandfather was the sculptor, . He graduated from the Piarist school in Malá Strana, where he was a pupil of the Bohemian historian, . During these years, he also took private painting lessons from Norbert Grund. Later, he became the first teacher of his younger brother, .

He returned to Prague the following year and, until his death, taught drawing at the Royal Normal school. In 1799, he helped establish the Academy of Fine Arts, Prague and, in 1818, he was awarded the Golden Medal for Civil Merit.

His early work shows traces of influence from the Baroque, but he later switched to Viennese Classicism.

Most of works involve interior and exterior views of monumental buildings, although he also created some works with religious and historical themes. He would sometimes collaborate with Clemens, who helped him turn his works into copperplate engravings. Of especial note are his proposed designs for the completion of St. Vitus Cathedral at the Prague Castle complex.

Sources 
 Gottfried Johann Dlabacz: Allgemeines historisches Künstler-Lexikon für Böhmen und zum Theile auch für Mähren und Schlesien. Band 2, Gottlieb Haase, Prag 1815, Sp. 96–101 (Online).
 Georg Kaspar Nagler Neues allgemeines Künstler-Lexicon oder Nachrichten aus dem Leben und den Werken der Maler, Bildhauer, Baumeister, Kupferstecher, Formschneider, Lithographen, Zeichner, Medailleure, Elfenbeinarbeiter, etc. Band 7, E. A. Fleischmann, München 1839, S. 127 (Online).
 Biography @ the Biographisches Lexikon des Kaiserthums Oesterreich
 
 Marcela Pánková: Ludvík Kohl (1746–1821). Národní Galerie, Prag 1984.

External links 

 More works by Kohl @ ArtNet

1746 births
1821 deaths
Austro-Hungarian painters
Czech painters
Academy of Fine Arts Vienna alumni
Artists from Prague
Czech etchers